Karl Georg Högström (4 November 1895 – 9 April 1976) was a Swedish pole vaulter. He competed at the 1920 Summer Olympics and finished in eighth place.

Högström won the national title in 1918 and 1919, and the English AAA Championship in 1919. His personal best of 3.80 m in 1918 was the world leading performance. Besides pole vaulting, in 1918 Högström won the national title in the high jump at 1.902 m, which was world's second-best jump that year. After retiring from competitions he became a bank executive.

References

1895 births
1976 deaths
Swedish male pole vaulters
Olympic athletes of Sweden
Athletes (track and field) at the 1920 Summer Olympics